Brady Drum Company was an Australian manufacturing company who specialised in handcrafted drums since 1980. The designs and workmanship was predominantly the duty of the company's creator, Chris Brady. The firm used native Australian hardwoods, particularly jarrah, sheoak, spotted gum, marri, wandoo and lemon scented gum for the drums they manufactured. The business was based in Armadale, an outer suburb of Perth, Western Australia.

History
Chris Brady introduced the world's first solid wood (hollow tree trunk) modern snare drum, and revolutionised the ply shell and block shell method of construction. He possibly created the world's first 10", 12" and 16" snare drums, and is credited with their popularisation in modern music.

The company's client list includes over 400 internationally renowned drummers including Will Calhoun, Steve Ferrone, Mick Fleetwood, Chad Smith, Patrick Wante, Jeff Porcaro (formerly), Larry Mullen, Jr, Tre Cool and Thomas Lang.  Though the company manufactures all drums shells, their fame is gained from their snare drums.

In April 2015, Brady Drum Company ceased production of their instruments, following Chris Brady's ongoing health complications. In November 2015, Brady Drum Company announced the closure of the company via its official website and Facebook page.

Sources

External links
 

Musical instrument manufacturing companies of Australia
Percussion instrument manufacturing companies
Companies established in 1980
Companies disestablished in 2015
Armadale, Western Australia
Manufacturing companies based in Perth, Western Australia